Lester Eubanks (born October 31, 1943) is an American criminal and fugitive who escaped prison in Ohio in 1973 after being jailed for the murder of 14-year-old Mary Ellen Deener. His disappearance featured on the Netflix series Unsolved Mysteries.

As of 2022, Eubanks was still listed on the United States Marshals Service's 15 Most Wanted Fugitives list.

After Eubanks was featured on the series, the U.S. Marshals said they believed he was still living in the Los Angeles area, having received photographs of him with friends there.

References

1943 births
Possibly living people
American murderers
Fugitives wanted by the United States